Nicolae Stoenescu (born 18 November 1938) is a Romanian boxer. He competed in the men's light middleweight event at the 1960 Summer Olympics. At the 1960 Summer Olympics, he lost to Souleymane Diallo of France.

References

1938 births
Living people
Romanian male boxers
Olympic boxers of Romania
Boxers at the 1960 Summer Olympics
People from Dobrich
Light-middleweight boxers